Kingsize or King size may refer to:

Bed size
A size of cigarettes and rolling paper
Kingsize (The Boo Radleys album), 1998
Kingsize (Five album), 2001
King Size (B.B. King album), 1977
King Size!, a 1959 album by André Previn
King-Size Homer, the seventh episode of The Simpsons' seventh season
Kingsize Soundlabs, a recording studio in Silver Lake, California
"Kingsize (You're My Little Steam Whistle)", a song by Haircut 100 from Pelican West
"King Size", a song by Anthrax from Stomp 442
King Syze, underground rapper from hip hop supergroup Army of the Pharaohs

See also
 Kingsajz, a 1987 Polish film
 "King Size Bed", an unreleased song by Peach PRC